Alvin Wright (February 5, 1961 – March 23, 2018) was a professional American football defensive lineman.  Wright, a nose tackle, played with the National Football League's Los Angeles Rams from 1986 to 1991 and was All-Pro in 1990.

High school and college

Wright graduated from Randolph County High School in 1980 after leading the football team to the state playoff finals in 1979 and earned a football scholarship with Jacksonville State University in Alabama.  Wright was Gulf South Conference Freshman of the Year in 1980 and Defensive Player of the Year in 1981.  He earned Honorable Mention All-America honors after the 1981 season.  Wright lettered four years at Jacksonville State and had 200 career solo tackles, 388 total tackles, and 30 quarterback sacks.  Wright led the Gamecocks to two Gulf South conference championships and three trips to the NCAA Division II playoffs.

Professional career

After college, Wright was drafted in the 14th round by the Birmingham Stallions of the USFL.  Rather than report to the Stallions, Wright went undrafted by the NFL and later signed as an undrafted free agent with the Rams in 1985.  He briefly left the Rams' camp, but returned in 1986 and spent most of that season on the injured list with a knee injury.  Wright was the first Rams player to cross the picket line during the 1987 NFL players' strike and started his first career game against the New Orleans Saints in Week 3.  He played 84 career games over seven seasons, starting 62, and recording 163 career solo tackles, 71 assists, and eight quarterback sacks.  Wright led all Rams defensive linemen in tackles for four consecutive seasons and started 50 consecutive games from 1988-1991.

Personal life
Wright had a wife named Sherri Wright (Baldy) and has two children, Brittany Shantelle Wright and Eric Pool (Wright).

Alvin Wright died of a heart attack on March 23, 2018.

References

External links
Alvin Wright career statistics at Pro-Football-Reference.com
NFL.com player page

1961 births
2018 deaths
People from Randolph County, Alabama
Players of American football from Alabama
American football defensive linemen
Jacksonville State Gamecocks football players
Los Angeles Rams players
National Football League replacement players